Eves of Destruction is a women's flat track roller derby league in Victoria, British Columbia. The league is organized as a non-profit organization. Eves of Destruction is a member of the Women's Flat Track Derby Association (WFTDA).

History and organization
Established in 2006 as Dead City Rollergirls, the league was the first women's flat track league in British Columbia. Eves of Destruction was founded on the motto of "By the Skaters, For the Skaters" and is a dedicated skater-run organization. Members compete in a yearly season at home, and also travel to other cities in Canada and the US to play competitive flat track roller derby.

Eves of Destruction joined the WFTDA Apprentice Program in October 2016 and became a full member league in January 2018.

WFTDA rankings

References

External links
 It's good versus evil, roller derby style
 Thrills and spills on four wheels score a comeback

Roller derby leagues in Canada
Sport in Victoria, British Columbia
Roller derby leagues established in 2006
2006 establishments in British Columbia